French singer and DJ Miss Kittin has released seven studio albums, one live album, three compilation albums, seven extended plays (EPs), and thirty-seven singles (including thirteen as a featured artist).

Albums

Studio albums

Live albums

Compilation albums

Extended plays

Singles

As lead artist

As featured artist

Guest appearances

Soundtrack appearances

Remixes

References

External links
 
 
 
 
 

 
Discographies of French artists
Electronic music discographies